Rick Steven Elmore (born February 1, 1988) is a former American football linebacker. He played college football at Arizona. Elmore was drafted by the Green Bay Packers in the sixth round of the 2011 NFL Draft.

College career 
Elmore racked up 128 tackles (33 for loss) and 25 sacks during his college career at Arizona.

Professional career

Green Bay Packers 
The Green Bay Packers selected Elmore with the 197th overall pick (6th round) of the 2011 NFL Draft.  He was cut by the Packers on September 3, 2011.

San Francisco 49ers 
Elmore was signed by the San Francisco 49ers to their practice squad on January 5, 2012.

San Diego Chargers 
Elmore was signed by the San Diego Chargers on February 6, 2012. he was waived on August 31, 2012.

Arizona Cardinals 
Elmore was signed by the Arizona Cardinals to their practice squad on September 3, 2012. He was waived on September 25, 2012.

Cleveland Browns 
Elmore was signed by the Cleveland Browns to their practice squad on November 13, 2012.

Washington Redskins 
Elmore was signed by the Washington Redskins to a futures/reserve contract on January 4, 2013. He was cut by the Redskins on August 26, 2013.

Personal life 
Along with his twin brother Cory, he appeared in the movie Easy Wheels as a baby.

References

External links
 Green Bay Packers bio

1988 births
Living people
Players of American football from California
People from Simi Valley, California
American football defensive ends
American football linebackers
Arizona Wildcats football players
San Diego Chargers players
Arizona Cardinals players
Cleveland Browns players
Washington Redskins players
Green Bay Packers players
Sportspeople from Ventura County, California